Viliamu Afatia (born 24 May 1990) is a Samoan rugby union player. He joined Agen ahead of the 2011/2012 season. He plays prop for Samoa on international level. Afatia also plays for Bordeaux Bègles in their Top 14 campaign.

Viliamu Afatia made his debut for Samoa coming off the bench against Tonga in the 2012 IRB Pacific Nations Cup. Afatia then was named in the Samoan squad for their 2012 end-of-year rugby union test matches against Canada, Wales and France. In 2015, he was selected for the 2015 Rugby World Cup.

References

External links

1990 births
Living people
Samoan rugby union players
SU Agen Lot-et-Garonne players
Racing 92 players
Samoan expatriate rugby union players
Expatriate rugby union players in France
Samoan expatriate sportspeople in France
Samoa international rugby union players
Rugby union props